The Gas Gang were a group of short-lived fictional robots in DC Comics. They first appeared in Metal Men #6.

Fictional team history
The story begins where the previous story "Menace of the Mammoth Robots!" left off. After dislodging a meteor from his ship's hull and rescuing the lone female robot Platinum, Dr. William "Will" Magnus had his spacesuit perforated by cosmic rays. The effect was that during their return trip to Earth, "Doc" Magnus became a robot himself, displaying none of the actual human and humane feelings toward his Metal Men or anything, even to the point of denying the Metal Men the opportunity to rescue another rocketship in distress. After they disobeyed orders and rescued the ship, Doc Magnus threatened to melt down his creations. For his own protection, after landing the Metal Men locked him in his lab and began experimenting on ways to make him human again. However, while they were busy with one failed experiment after another, the lab door burst open and Doc Magnus introduced his new robots, the Gas Gang. Unlike the Metal Men (each of whom was based on a different metal), these were based on (and named for) the gases Oxygen, Helium, Chloroform, Carbon Monoxide, and Carbon Dioxide. Whereas the Metal Men were approximately the same size as Doctor Magnus, the Gas Gang were anywhere from one-third to twice his size. On Chloroform's initial attack, it caused the Metal Men to break out in fits of hysteria ala Nitrous Oxide (Laughing Gas) which Doc Magnus said was chloroform's initial effect. Before Lead could wall them off, Mercury literally "broke up laughing", opening Oxygen to attack and causing the Metal Men to begin to rust. During the chase Carbon Monoxide (called "CM" by Carbon Dioxide) attempted to poison them with fumes, while Carbon Dioxide (called "CD" by Carbon Monoxide) attempted to freeze them. The chase ended in one of the labs where Gold was attempting heat conduction on the others as a possible cure for their creator. As Helium expanded and cornered the Metal Men, Platinum got Gold to repeat the experiment, stretching and transforming himself into a large cage and trapping the Gas Gang. When he connected himself to the high-voltage conductors he melted the Gas Gang and converted them all to steam. That was when they discovered Doctor Magnus had been trapped in there with them, and as it turned out is what cured him and made him human again.

The Gas Gang was rebuilt in #10 when the Metal Men had returned from a space mission amalgamated, enlarged to colossal size and mentally unbalanced. Carrying out Doc Magnus' instructions to defeat the Metal Men Collective and then bring them (it) to Doc, they then turn against Doc and try to kill him. Once again they are defeated and eradicated.

They act offstage as some of the rebuilt enemies of the Metal Men, brought back by Platinum Man (created and app. destroyed in #32) in a revenge scheme against Doc Magnus who seemingly had abandoned him and the Metal Women (in Brave & the Bold #187). They run off and do not reappear in that story.

Members
 Oxygen - A Gas Gang member in the form of a walking oxygen tank.
 Helium - A Gas Gang member in the form of a rubberized container that could expand.
 Carbon Monoxide - A Gas Gang member in the form of a walking lit Bunsen Burner. His face and head were made of fire.
 Chloroform - A Gas Gang member in the form of a walking cylindrical tank perforated with holes from which it emitted its gas.
 Carbon Dioxide - A Gas Gang member that resembles an anthropomorphic dry ice crystal.

In other media
A variation of the Gas Gang appear in the Batman: The Brave and the Bold episode "Clash of the Metal Men", consisting of Oxygen (voiced by Brian Bloom), Carbon Dioxide (Hynden Walch), Helium (Bill Fagerbakke), Chloroform - who has no dialogue - and series original characters Hydrogen (Lex Lang) and Nitrogen, the latter of whom also has no dialogue. This version of the group were Will Magnus' former colleagues who were believed to have been killed in a lab accident while trying to develop a gas that can trigger volcanic eruptions and cause mass destruction, only to be turned into gaseous beings. In the present, the Gas Gang kidnap Magnus and take him to their volcano lair in order to force him to build robotic bodies to store their fading gaseous bodies. After Magnus builds a hydrogen bomb-esque body for Hydrogen, Carbon Dioxide's comics body for Nitrogen, Carbon Monoxide's comics body for Carbon Dioxide, and Helium and Chloroform's standard comics bodies, they strap him to a chemical container and lower it into the volcano, but Batman and the Metal Men arrive to rescue Magnus. The Gas Gang combine their robotic bodies and overpower the heroes until Batman throws a torch at them, destroying their robotic forms and fusing their gaseous forms into a deadly gas cloud. The Gas Gang attempt to pursue Batman, the Metal Men, and Magnus, but Batman sets his Batplane to self-destruct to destroy the gang.

References

Metal Men
DC Comics robots
DC Comics supervillain teams
Robot supervillains